North Button Island National Park is a national park in the Andaman and Nicobar Islands along the coast of India.

North Button Island National Park was set up in 1979 and situated in the Andaman district. The best months for visiting the park are from December to March. 
Most of the park is covered with deciduous forest. The park is one of the warm and humid tropical zones.

Flora and fauna 
The fauna found here constitute of dugong, dolphin, water monitor, lizard etc.

References 

National parks in the Andaman and Nicobar Islands
Ritchie's Archipelago
Protected areas established in 1979
1979 establishments in the Andaman and Nicobar Islands
Islands of India